A Message from Mars is a 1903 New Zealand short film by Franklyn Barrett, based on a play by Richard Ganthony that had been highly popular in Australia and New Zealand.

Another version of this film was made in 1913 in the UK as A Message from Mars (1913 film). In December 2014, the British Film Institute announced this latter film was posted online on their website.

Plot
A Martian comes to Earth to show a human he is selfish.

Cast
Peter Savieri
Mrs Savieri
Gus Neville
Miss Foley

Preservation status
This 1903 film was New Zealand's first fiction film and is now considered a lost film.

References

External links
A Message From Mars at IMDB
A Message From Mars at Silent Era

1900s New Zealand films
1903 films
1903 in New Zealand
1900s science fiction films
Lost New Zealand films
New Zealand films based on plays
1903 short films
New Zealand silent short films
1900s lost films
Films directed by Franklyn Barrett
Lost science fiction films